Brassaiopsis kwangsiensis is a species of plant in the family Araliaceae. It is endemic to China.

References

Endemic flora of China
kwangsiensis
Endangered plants
Taxonomy articles created by Polbot
Plants described in 1965